The Running Horse is a pub in the town of Leatherhead, Surrey, England.

Dating back to 1403, on the bank of the River Mole, the Running Horse is located in one of the oldest buildings in Leatherhead.

History
Built in the 15th century on land belonging to the church, The Running Horse was originally known as Rummings House, after Eleynor Rumminge who was written about by Henry VIII's poet John Skelton. The poem can be found on a wall in the pub.

References

External links
 http://www.running-horse.co.uk/

Pubs in Surrey